Ray Wetzel (September 22, 1924 – August 17, 1951) was an American jazz trumpeter. Critic Scott Yanow described him as "greatly admired by his fellow trumpeters".

Career

Wetzel played lead trumpet for Woody Herman from 1943 to 1945 and for Stan Kenton from 1945 to 1948. He recorded in 1947 with the Metronome All-Stars, Vido Musso, and Neal Hefti, and married bass player Bonnie Addleman in 1949. While with the Charlie Barnet Orchestra in 1949, he played trumpet alongside Maynard Ferguson, Doc Severinsen, and Rolf Ericson. He played with his wife in Tommy Dorsey's ensemble in 1950 and with Kenton again in 1951. 

While touring with Dorsey in 1951, he was killed in a car crash at the age of 27. He never recorded as a leader. He is credited with composing the Stan Kenton tune 'Intermission Riff'.

Discography
With Stan Kenton
 Artistry in Rhythm (Capitol, 1946)
 Encores (Capitol, 1947)
 A Presentation of Progressive Jazz (Capitol, 1947)
 Stan Kenton's Milestones (Capitol, 1950)
 Stan Kenton Classics (Capitol, 1952)
 Popular Favorites by Stan Kenton (Capitol, 1953)
 The Kenton Era (Capitol, 1955)

References

1924 births
1951 deaths
20th-century American male musicians
20th-century American musicians
20th-century trumpeters
American jazz trumpeters
American male jazz musicians
American male trumpeters